Titular Patriarch(ate) of Jerusalem may refer to the following Catholic patriarchal titles without residential see as such :  

 Latin Patriarch of Jerusalem#Titular Latin Patriarchate of Jerusalem
 Titular Melkite Patriarch of Jerusalem, informally Jerusalem of the Melkites, a title vested in the Melkite Patriarch of Antioch, like Titular Melkite Patriarch of Alexandria